Airlock is a Belgium based trip hop musical group formed November 1997 in Brussels notable for their ambient music on several popular TV series:  CSI: Crime Scene Investigation and CSI: Miami. The band members were Renaud Charlier, Ernst W. Meinrath and Pierre Mussche.

Discography 
 Drystar - 2002
 Symptomatic - 2004
 The Long Journey Home - 2005
 The Room - 2006

External links 
 The band's website
 CD101.9 profile of band
 The website of Ernst W. Meinrath composer & ex-member of the band

Belgian electronic music groups
Trip hop groups